Aimee Mayo is a Grammy Award-nominated songwriter from Gadsden, Alabama.

Biography
Aimee Mayo grew up in Gadsden, Alabama. She moved to Nashville when she was 17. She was signed as a songwriter with BMG There she met her husband Chris while she was still a teenager. When she was 28 she married fellow songwriter Chris Lindsey, they have four children and live in Nashville, Tennessee. Aimee and Chris also own their own recording studio in Nashville Tennessee called Aimeeland. There, Taylor Swift recorded her third studio album Speak Now (2010) and Keith Urban recorded his seventh studio album Get Closer (2010).

As a teen, Aimee was surrounded by music. Her father Danny Mayo wrote hits for numerous hits like "Feed Jake" and "Keeper of the Stars". Her brother Cory Mayo wrote "You'll Be There", a hit for George Strait in 2005. As of 2008, Mayo's songs have spent twenty-five weeks in the #1 spot on the Billboard charts, and albums featuring her songs have sold over 135 million units worldwide.

Her songs have spent twenty-six weeks on the #1 spot on the Billboard charts, and albums featuring her songs have sold over 155 million units worldwide. She is primarily known for writing hits for artists such as Taylor Swift, Tim McGraw, Lonestar, Meghan Trainor, the Civil Wars, Backstreet Boys, Adam Lambert Kenny Chesney, Carrie Underwood Martina McBride, Sara Evans, Faith Hill, Blake Shelton, Boyz II Men, Brad Paisley, Billy Currington, Kellie Pickler  and more. Mayo is one of the few female artist to receive both BMI's Country Song of the Year and Songwriter of the Year awards, putting her in the rare company of Dolly Parton and Taylor Swift. Mayo was also a judge on the CMT reality-competition show, Can You Duet. In 2020, Mayo released a memoir titled Talking to the Sky

Mayo was named BMI Songwriter of the Year in 2000. "Amazed", recorded by Lonestar that same year, is her most popular song to date. In 2004 it garnered a 5 Millionaire award from BMI, vaulting it into the top 125 songs in the BMI catalog out of 6.5 million works. "Amazed" also won ACM (Academy of Country Music) Song of the Year, BMI Song of the Year, NSAI Song of the Year and was nominated for a Grammy. "Amazed" crossed over to the pop charts and spent two weeks at the top of the Hot 100, making it the first country song to accomplish such a feat since Dolly Parton and Kenny Rogers with their 1983 song "Islands in the Stream".

Mayo's song "This One’s for the Girls," recorded by Martina McBride, stayed at #1 on Billboard'''s Adult Contemporary chart for eleven weeks in addition to reaching number three on the country chart. The song also went on to be a theme song for the morning show The View, Mayo has received over a dozen BMI Country awards along with BMI Pop Awards for "Amazed" and "This One's for the Girls".

Mayo co-wrote the song "Wheel of the World" on Carrie Underwood’s second studio album with husband Chris Lindsey and close friend and collaborator Hillary Lindsey. The title Carnival Ride was chosen by Underwood from the lyrics of "Wheel of the World."

Mayo was a judge on the CMT television series, Can You Duet''.

Discography
Tim McGraw: “My Best Friend”, “Let’s Make Love”, “Drugs or Jesus”, "Let It Go", “Things Change”,  “Seventeen”, "Smilin", 
Lonestar: Amazed
The civil wars: Poison & Wine
Taylor Swift: “Speak Now”
"Let Me Love You", "Good Girls", "Doggone"
Faith Hill: “Red Umbrella”, “Let’s Make Love”, “You’re Still Here”, “There Will Come a Day”, "Beautiful", "Me"
Kenny Chesney: “Who You'd Be Today”, "California", "Bar at the End of the World"
Carrie Underwood: “Wheel of The World”, "Oh Love"
Martina McBride: “This One's for the Girls”, “How I Feel"
Lonestar: “Amazed”, "I Am A Man"
 Brad Paisley: "Oh Love"
Blake Shelton: "Every Time I Hear That Song"
Sara Evans: "Backseat of a Greyhound Bus", "Feels Just Like a Love Song", "Three Chords and the Truth", "Pray For You", "Love You With All My Heart", "The Secrets That We Keep", "You Don't"
Kellie Pickler: "I Wonder", "Red High Heels", "Don't You Know You're Beautiful", "Didn't You Know How Much I Loved You", "Going Out in Style", "One Last Time", "Somebody to Love Me", "My Angel", "Small Town Girl", "Happy", "One Of The Guys", "I Forgive You"
Backstreet Boys: "Helpless When She Smiles"
 Jessica Simpson: "When I Loved You Like That"
Mark Wills: "Places I’ve Never Been", "Days of Thunder", "I Just Close My Eyes", "Panama City", "When Did I Lose You"
Heidi Newfield: “Cry Cry (Til the Sun Shines)"
Billy Currington: "Tangled Up"
Caitlin & Will: "Address in the Stars", "Dark Horse"
Deana Carter: "Liar", "Make Up Your Mind"
Ashley Gearing: “Out the Window”
Jessica Andrews:  "I Wish For You", "Karma", "Never Be Forgotten", "Now"
Joe Diffie: "It’s Always Somethin'"
Carolyn Dawn Johnson: "Simple Life"
Jimmy Wayne: “You Are”, "Are You Ever Gonna Love Me", "Trespassin' "
Mila Mason: “Closer to Heaven”
Rachel Proctor: “Where I Belong”
Adam Lambert: "Sleepwalker"
Chris Cagle": "Are You Ever Gonna Love Me"
Kip Moore”: “Crazy One More Time”
Patrizio Buanne: "Let's Make Love"
Trace Adkins: "Can I Want Your Love", "Words Get in the Way"
Bonnie Tyler: "Amazed"
Julie Roberts: "Men & Mascara"
Jo Dee Messina: "Closer"
Joe Nichols: "Let's Get Drunk and Fight"
Rhett Akins: "More Than Everything"
Aaron Lines: "Let's Get Drunk and Fight"
William Topley: "Nothing Like You", "Closer To You", "Nothing Else Matters"
Chely Wright: "Unknown"
The Kinleys- "(Ooh, Aah) Crazy Kind of Love Thing"
Mindy McCready: "Over and Over", "Take Me Apart", "Thunder and Roses"
Mark Chesnutt: "Strangers", "I'll Get You Back"
Crystal Shawanda: "I Need A Man"
Pam Tillis: "Thunder and Roses"
Carter's Chord: "Young Love"
Lorrie Morgan: "Rocks"
Danielle Bradbery: "Wild Boy"
Erika Jo: "Who You Are"
Easton Corbin: "Someday When I'm Old"
Blue Country: "Firecrackers and Ferris Wheels"
David Nail: "Strangers On A Train"
Jim Lauderdale: "Understanding Everything"
VanVelzen: "I'm Here"
Katharine McPhee: "Say Goodbye"
Caitlyn Smith: "House of Cards"
Boyz II Men: "Amazed"
Casey James: "Miss Your Fire"
Westside Cast: "Champagne High (feat. Alexandra Kay, Taz Zavala, Pia Toscano)

References

External links
 Official Website
 
 
 

1971 births
Living people
American women country singers
American country singer-songwriters
Musicians from Gadsden, Alabama
21st-century American singers
21st-century American women singers
Country musicians from Alabama
Singer-songwriters from Alabama